Margaret Court and Virginia Wade were the reigning champions. They did not compete to defend their titles.

Seeds

Draw

Finals

Top half

Bottom half

External links
 1974 Australian Open – Women's draws and results at the International Tennis Federation

Women's Doubles
Australian Open (tennis) by year – Women's doubles